John Sheridan Smylie served as the ninth bishop of the Episcopal Diocese of Wyoming from 2010 to 2020.

Biography
Smylie graduated with a Bachelor of Arts from Syracuse University, and a Master of Divinity from the Episcopal Divinity School in Cambridge, Massachusetts in 1981. He was ordained deacon in 1981, and priest in the Diocese of Newark in 1982. He served as associate rector of Calvary Church in Summit, New Jersey, and then rector of Trinity Church in Hamburg, New York. Between 1998 and 2005, he served as Dean of the Cathedral of St John the Evangelist in Spokane, Washington. Between 2007 and 2010, he served as rector of St Mark's Church in Casper, Wyoming.

He was elected bishop on March 20, 2010, consecrated on July 31, 2010, and installed in his cathedral on August 8, 2010.

He was married to the Reverend Betsy Dawn Inskeep Smylie, author and episcopal priest who served as missioner to the deaf for the Episcopal Diocese of Western New York from 1989 to the spring of 1998. Betsey died in 1999.

See also
 List of Episcopal bishops of the United States
 Historical list of the Episcopal bishops of the United States

References 

Episcopal Clerical Directory

Living people
Year of birth missing (living people)
Place of birth missing (living people)
Episcopal bishops of Wyoming
Syracuse University alumni
Episcopal Divinity School alumni